Kika Thorne is a Canadian artist, filmmaker, curator, and activist. She was born in Toronto in 1964, where she is currently based.

Life 
In 1990, Thorne graduated from the Ontario College of Art and Design (OCAD University) in Toronto, Ontario, in Media Production and Cultural Theory, and went on to receive her Master of Fine Arts (MFA) from the University of Victoria in Victoria, British Columbia.

Artistic practice 
In her early career, Thorne worked largely in film and moving image and also co-founded a feminist, cable television collective called SHE/TV (1991-1998) which aimed to mentor female filmmakers in producing experimental TV. Between 1996 and 2004, Thorne collaborated with fellow artist Adrian Blackwell to produce videos, installations and civic interventions. Thorne also worked as a curator for Vancouver's VIVO Media Arts Centre where she helped instigate a series of actions to express dissent around issues of the 2010 Winter Olympics in Vancouver.

With her multimedia/sculptural installations, Thorne works with the materials of mylar, elastic cord, rare earth magnets, plant-derived ink, aircraft cables, and other non-traditional art materials. Themes in her practice include an interest in geometry, physics, the visible spectrum, and social practice.

Select group exhibitions 

 2015: Nuit Blanche, Toronto, Ontario 
 2015: Silva Part I: O Horizon, Nanaimo Art Gallery, Nanaimo, British Columbia
 2015: Geometry of Knowing, SFU Gallery, Burnaby, British Columbia 
 2014: One Possible Arrangement, Katzman Contemporary, Toronto, Ontario
 2013: Things’ Matter, Or Gallery, Vancouver, British Columbia
 2013: I Thought There Were Limits, Justina M. Barnicke Gallery, Toronto, Ontario
 2010: 4D Uncharted, STATTBAD Wedding, Berlin,Germany
 2009: 4D Uncharted, STATTBAD Wedding, Berlin, Germany
 2007: Gasoline Rainbows, Contemporary Art Gallery, Vancouver, British Columbia
 2007: Street Scene, Murray Guy, New York City

Solo exhibitions 

 2014: Multiplicity of the Singularity, Art Gallery of Greater Victoria, Victoria, British Columbia

Film screenings 

 2011: Singularity, Berlinale Forum Expanded, Berlin, Germany
2004: VS., Latvian House, Toronto, Ontario
 2002: Confessions of a Sociopath by Joe Gibbons (In Person), CineCycle, Toronto, Ontario
 2000: Pleasure Dome's 10th Anniversary Screening, CineCycle, Toronto, Ontario
 1997: New Toronto Works Show, CineCycle, Toronto, Ontario
 1995: Puberty Film Show, CineCycle, Toronto, Ontario

Collective work/civic interventions 

 2018: Gentrification Tax, Gentrification Tax Action, Toronto, Ontario
 2010: SAFE ASSEMBLY (curated), VIVO Media Arts Centre, Vancouver, British Columbia
 2003: ambience for a future city, Anarchist Free School, Toronto, Ontario
 1997: Sod Roll for Shawn Keegan, The April Group, Toronto, Ontario
 1997: Untitled (mattresses), The February Group, Toronto, Ontario
 1996: Untitled (inflatable), The October Group, Toronto, Ontario

Honours 

 1997: Winner Best Canadian Video Images Film and Video Festival

References 

1964 births
Living people
21st-century Canadian women artists
OCAD University alumni
University of Victoria alumni
Canadian video artists
Canadian curators
Activists from Toronto